David Giguère is a Canadian singer-songwriter, and film, television and stage actor. He is from Quebec. He is signed to the Audiogram record label.

Beginnings
After studying theatre at the CEGEP Collège Lionel-Groulx, Montreal, Quebec, he worked with Emmanuel Schwartz, and eventually Marc Beaupré with whom he had two roles in Caligula (remix) and Dom Juan... Uncensored

In 2011, he took part in Starbuck, a Quebec comedy film directed by Ken Scott and sang "L'atelier" on the soundtrack.

Music career
In 2012 he released his debut album produced by Pierre-Philippe Côté (aka Pilou) and artistic collaboration and co-production by singer songwriter Ariane Moffatt and Mo'fat Productions. In August 2012, he engaged on a Quebec tour Tournée Sirius XM that also included Loco Locass and Pierre Lapointe and in 2013, he performed at Les FrancoFolies de Montréal. In 2014 he released his second album Casablanca on Audiogram.

Discography

Albums

2012: Hisser haut [Mo'fat Productions / Audiogram]

Track list
"Dépanneur" (1:03)
"Désirs" (2:53)
"L'Atelier" (3:22)
"1-2" (3:16)
"Encore" (3:19)
"Viens que je te griffe" (3:18)
"La chose" (3:11)
"C'est pas elle" (3:26)
"Madame M" (3:34)
"Hisser haut" (3:40)
"Carambolage" (2:54)
"Comme toi" (2:29)
"Permettez-moi (1:22)
Plus: Digital Booklet

2014: Casablanca [Audiogram]

Track list
"Tuons nos enfants (4:29)
"La noyade (Mami Wata)" (3:51)
"L'Échec de l'Odéon" (3:23)
"La pornographie" (5:45)
"La honte" (4:40)
"Océanic 815 ** *****" (3:10)
"Gun" (3:20)
"Aimer aimer" (3:39)
"Albert Prévost" (2:34)
"La durée" (4:49)
"Casablanca" (5:39)
Plus: Digital Booklet

Singles / videography
2011: "Elle et lui" 
2011: "L'atelier" (from soundtrack of Starbuck)
2012: "Encore"
2014: "La pornographie"
2014: "La noyade (Mami Wata)

Filmography
2010: Un tueur si proche (1 episode "Mauvais coup (3 Ados)" as Félix - TV documentary series) 
2011: Laurentie as brother of Louis
2011: Starbuck as speaker
2011: Le bleu des confettis (Short film)
2014: Série Noire (7 episodes as Mathieu - TV series)

Soundtrack
2011: Starbuck in song "L'atelier"

Theatre
2012: Caligula (Remix) directed by Marc Beaupré to words of Albert Camus (Emmanuel Schwartz, David Giguère, Ève Landry, Guillaume Tellier, Michel Mongeau, Alexis Lefebvre, Emmanuelle Orange-Parent)
2012: Dom Juan... Uncensored directed by Marc Beaupré (David Giguère in title role)

References

External links
Official website

Canadian male singers
Canadian songwriters
Canadian male film actors
Canadian male television actors
Canadian male stage actors
French Quebecers
Singers from Quebec
French-language singers of Canada
Living people
Year of birth missing (living people)